Kevin Stead (2 October 1958 – 19 January 2016) was an English professional footballer who played as a defender for Tottenham Hotspur, Arsenal and Oxford City.

Life and career
Stead was born in West Ham, London, and began his career playing youth football as a defender with Tottenham Hotspur, where his older brother Micky was already a player. He never made a first-team appearance for Tottenham, and moved on to rivals Arsenal on a free transfer in July 1977. He was a regular in the reserves in the Football Combination, made his first-team debut on 14 October 1978, as a substitute in a 1–0 defeat away to Wolverhampton Wanderers in the Football League First Division, and played his second and final match for Arsenal's first team the following week, starting in a 1–0 win at home to Southampton. He was released in September 1979, and joined Isthmian League club Oxford City.

After retiring from football, Stead worked as a taxi-driver. He was married to Sharon and had two daughters. He died at his home in Dagenham in 2016 at the age of 57.

References

1958 births
2016 deaths
Footballers from West Ham
English footballers
Association football defenders
Tottenham Hotspur F.C. players
Arsenal F.C. players
Oxford City F.C. players
English Football League players
British taxi drivers